The Louis Bachelier Prize is a biennial prize in applied mathematics jointly awarded by the London Mathematical Society, the Natixis Foundation for Quantitative Research and the Société de Mathématiques Appliquées et Industrielles (SMAI) in recognition for "exceptional contributions to mathematical modelling in finance, insurance, risk management and/or scientific computing applied to finance and insurance."

The prize is named in honor of French mathematician Louis Bachelier, a pioneer in the field of probability and its use in financial modeling.

Description

The Louis Bachelier Prize was created in 2007 by the Société de Mathématiques Appliquées et Industrielles [Society for Applied and Industrial Mathematics] in collaboration with the Natixis Quantitative Research Foundation and  the French Academy of Sciences. The prize, of 20,000, is awarded biennially to a scientist with less than 25 years of postdoctoral experience. The candidates must be permanent residents of a country of the European Union. From its creation in 2015, the Louis Bachelier Prize was awarded by the French Academy of Sciences. Since 2015, the prize is administered by the  London Mathematical Society.

Winners
 2022 : 
 2020 : 
 2018 : Pauline Barrieu
 2016 : Damir Filipović
 2014 : Josef Teichmann
 2012 : Nizar Touzi
 2010 : Rama Cont
 2007 :

See also

 List of mathematics awards

References

External links 
 

French awards
French science and technology awards
Awards established in 2007
Awards of the London Mathematical Society
Early career awards